The 1922 Georgia Tech Golden Tornado football team represented the Georgia Tech Golden Tornado of the Georgia Institute of Technology during the 1922 Southern Conference football season. The Tornado was coached by William Alexander in his third year as head coach, compiling a record of 7–2 (4–0 SoCon) and outscoring opponents 157 to 59.

Red Barron made Walter Camp's second-team All-America.

Before the season
1922 is the first season of the new Southern Conference, and freshmen were barred from play.

In the line, at either end one finds brothers John and Al Staton. At guard was Oscar Davis, who with Barron was later named to an All-Tech Alexander era team.

Schedule

Season summary

Oglethorpe

Sources:

The season opened with a 31–6 defeat over the Oglethorpe Stormy Petrels. Red Barron scored two touchdowns, and Oglethorpe's Adrian Maurer had a 90-yard touchdown run.

The starting lineup was J. Staton (left end), Johnson (left tackle), McIntyre (left guard), Frye (center), Davis (right guard), Lyman (right tackle), A. Staton (right end), McDonough (quarterback), Barron (left halfback), Brewster (right halfback), Hunt (fullback).

Davidson
In the second week of play, Tech beat the Davidson Wildcats 19–0. Red Barron ran for 116 yards and two touchdowns despite playing for only part of the contest.

The starting lineup was J. Staton (left end), Johnson (left tackle), McIntyre (left guard), Frye (center), Davis (right guard), A. Staton (right tackle), Mitchel(right end), McDonough (quarterback), Barron (left halfback), Rather (right halfback), Hunt (fullback).

Alabama

Sources:

Tech defeated the Alabama Crimson Tide 33–7. Alabama's score came when Country Oliver returned a kickoff 95 yards.

The starting lineup was J. Staton (left end), Cornell (left tackle), McIntyre (left guard), Frye (center), Davis (right guard), A. Staton (right tackle), Mitchell (right end), McDonough (quarterback), Barron (left halfback), McWhorter (right halfback), Hunt (fullback).

Navy
Red Barron played well in the 13–0 loss to the Navy Midshipmen.

The starting lineup was J. Staton (left end), Connell (left tackle), McIntyre (left guard), Frye (center), Davis (right guard), A. Staton (right tackle), Mitchell (right end), McDonough (quarterback), Barron (left halfback), McWhorter (right halfback), Hunt (fullback).

Notre Dame
Tech played Knute Rockne's Notre Dame Fighting Irish for the first time. The Four Horsemen were sophomores playing their first year on the varsity, and beat Tech 13–3. The Irish stopped Red Barron.

The starting lineup was J. Staton (left end), Usry (left tackle), McConnel (left guard), Frye (center), Davis (right guard), Lyman (right tackle), A. Staton (right end), McDonough (quarterback), Barron (left halfback), Brewster (right halfback), Hunt (fullback)

Clemson
The Clemson Tigers were defeated 21–7. Coach Alexander used a different platoon each quarter.

The starting lineup was J. Staton (left end), Usery (left tackle), McConell (left guard), Frye (center), Davis (right guard), Lyman (right tackle), A. Staton (right end), McDonough (quarterback), Barron (left halfback), Brewster (right halfback), Hunt (fullback).

Georgetown

Sources:

Tech's backfield starred in a 19–7 defeat of the Georgetown Blue and Gray. Jack McDonough scored two touchdowns and Brewster another. Flavin scored for Georgetown.

The starting lineup was J. Staton (left end), Usry (left tackle), McIntyre (left guard), Frye (center), Davis (right guard), A. Staton (right tackle), Mitchell (right end), McDonough (quarterback), Barron (left halfback), Brewster (right halfback), Hunt (fullback).

NC State

Sources:

The Tornado shutout the NC State Wolfpack 17–0. Henry Reeves made a 40-yard drop kick.

The starting lineup was Gardner (left end), Johnson (left tackle), McConnell (left guard), Fleetwood (center), Borum (right guard), Lyman (right tackle), Mitchell (right end), McDonough (quarterback), Barron (left halfback), Brewster (right halfback), Hunt (fullback)

Auburn

Sources:

Tech beat coach Mike Donahue's rival Auburn Tigers to secure a share of the SoCon championship. The 1922 team is considered one of Auburn's greatest football teams, and they had lost only to undefeated Army. Still Tech held the Tigers without a first down in the second and third periods. Ed Sherling scored Auburn's touchdown on a 16-yard rush.

The starting lineup was J. Staton (left end), Usry (left tackle), McIntyre (left guard), Frye (center), Davis (right guard), Lyman (right tackle), A. Staton (right end), McDonough (quarterback), Barron (left halfback), Brewster (right halfback), Hunt (fullback).

Postseason
Red Barron and Vanderbilt's Lynn Bomar were the only unanimous All-Southern selections.

Personnel

Depth chart
The following chart provides a visual depiction of Tech's lineup during the 1922 season with games started at the position reflected in parenthesis. The chart mimics the offense after the jump shift has taken place.

Notes

Endnotes

References
 
 

Georgia Tech
Georgia Tech Yellow Jackets football seasons
Georgia Tech Golden Tornado football
1920s in Atlanta